Duck Butter is a 2018 American independent film directed by Miguel Arteta, from a screenplay by Arteta and Alia Shawkat. It stars Shawkat, Laia Costa, Mae Whitman, Hong Chau and Kate Berlant.

It had its world premiere at the Tribeca Film Festival on April 20, 2018. It was released on April 27, 2018, by The Orchard.

Plot summary
Nima is an actor beginning work on her first major film, directed by Mark and Jay. She struggles to connect with the material, and has a conversation about it with Mark and Jay, who imply that it is due to a lack of vulnerability on her part. After taking a friend to a date at a gay bar, Nima meets Sergio, an esoteric girl who performs a song at the bar. After going home with Sergio and her friends, the two have sex. While discussing relationships, Sergio proposes the idea of spending 24 hours with a person - including having sex once per hour - in order to 'fast forward' a relationship and get to know a person as quickly as possible. Nima is uncomfortable and declines, but continues to be intrigued by the idea the next day after the freedom she felt with Sergio.

Nima receives a call that she has been replaced on the movie. That evening, she spontaneously decides to return to Sergio's house and take her up on her offer. Sergio is reticent, but decides to go through with it after Nima promises not to leave. Over the course of the evening, the two create art, have sex, and discuss their feelings on life, sex, and previous relationships with both men and women. Sergio is more adventurous and unburdened by societal pressures, while Nima struggles with her insecurities. At different points throughout the night she feels excited by Sergio's free spiritedness, but frustrated by her aggressive frankness, both conversationally and sexually.

The two share about their difficult relationships with their mothers. Sergio's mother Susana comes to see her perform in a musical showcase. Nima suggests that they eat breakfast at Nima's house, which was purchased for her by her father. Nima begins to feel friction in the relationship, briefly suffering a panic attack and dealing with Sergio's anxiety about her mother's arrival. While eating, Sergio and Susana have an argument, with Susana criticizing Sergio's artistic integrity. Susana shares her opinions on sex with Nima, claiming that it is more impersonal than love. Sergio is upset after Susana leaves; after Susana returns to retrieve her forgotten iPad, Nima comforts and kisses Sergio while looking at Susana, who silently leaves. Despite this, the relationship between the two remains strained.

Nima suggests that they have group sex with Kathy and Fay, a couple Sergio is friends with. Sergio is upset by the idea but agrees to it. As the four begin kissing, however, Nima becomes overwhelmed by the situation. Despite her asking Kathy and Fay to stay to discuss the situation, they decide to leave. The tension between the two reaches its peak as Nima retreats to the bathroom to be alone. In retaliation, Sergio defecates in a pan, something she used to do to her mother as a child. The two argue, with Sergio criticizing Nima for failing to be honest during their time together. Sergio leaves the house.

At the music showcase, Sergio performs an a capella cover of Elvis Presley's 'Suppose', hearkening back to an argument between her and Nima about cover songs. After spending the evening frightened and annoyed by Sergio's dog, Nima rescues a dog she sees on the street.

Cast
 Alia Shawkat as Naima/Nima
 Laia Costa as Sergio
 Mae Whitman as Ellen
 Hong Chau as Glow
 Kate Berlant as Kathy
 Lindsay Burdge as herself
 Kumail Nanjiani as himself
 Mark Duplass as himself
 Jay Duplass as himself
 Jenny O'Hara as Nathalie

Production
The initial draft of the film, written by Alia Shawkat and Miguel Arteta, the film focused on a  male and a female couple over the course of a year-and-a-half. Then it shifted to a male and female couple who decide to have sex every hour on the hour to find intimacy. Shawkat, who was cast in the lead role, met with actors, who were uncomfortable with the idea. The two initially cast Laia Costa, who only agreed to portray a supporting role in the film if she could remain on set during the entire 24-hour shoot. Arteta and Shawkat decided to re-write the role for a woman.

In September 2016, it was announced Shawkat and Costa had been cast in the film, with Arteta directing from a screenplay by him and Shawkat. Mark Duplass and Jay Duplass will serve as producers under their Duplass Brothers Productions banner.

Principal photography began in September 2016, over the course of nine days, with majority of the film being shot over the course of 24 hours.

Release
In 2018, Variety announced that The Orchard and Netflix would distribute the film. It had its world premiere at the Tribeca Film Festival on April 20, 2018. It was released on April 27, 2018.

Critical reception
Duck Butter received mixed reviews from film critics. The website's critical consensus reads, "Duck Butter has a pair of compelling leads and a refreshing female-driven perspective, but its story is ultimately too thin to support a feature-length production." On Metacritic, the film holds a rating of 60 out of 100, based on 15 critics, indicating "mixed or average reviews".

Katie Rife of The A.V. Club gave the film a C+, panning it for not giving Costa's character depth and calling the film "clever without being all that hilarious, and personal without being all that revealing".

Accolades

References

External links
 
 
 

2018 films
American comedy films
American independent films
2018 LGBT-related films
American LGBT-related films
LGBT-related comedy films
Lesbian-related films
Duplass Brothers Productions films
The Orchard (company) films
Films directed by Miguel Arteta
2018 independent films
2010s English-language films
2010s American films